Coury is a surname. Notable people with the surname include:

Al Coury (1934–2013), vice-president of American record label Capitol Records
Dick Coury (1929–2020), American football coach
Fred Coury (born 1964), American musician 
Gabriel Coury (1896–1956), British Army officer and Victoria Cross recipient
Steve Coury (born 1957), American football player and coach
Tino Coury (born 1988), American singer, songwriter, producer
Mike Courey (1959–2007), American football player